The men's triple jump at the 2008 Olympic Games took place on 18–21 August at the Beijing Olympic Stadium. Thirty-nine athletes from 26 nations competed. The event was won by Nelson Évora of Portugal, the nation's first medal and victory in the men's triple jump. Leevan Sands's bronze medal was the Bahamas' second bronze in the event, with the previous one in 1992.

Background

This was the 26th appearance of the event, which is one of 12 athletics events to have been held at every Summer Olympics. The returning finalists from the 2004 Games were silver medalist Marian Oprea of Romania, bronze medalist Danil Burkenya of Russia, fifth-place finisher Jadel Gregório of Brazil, ninth-place finisher Kenta Bell of the United States, and Phillips Idowu of Great Britain, who had not made a legal mark in the final but whose qualifying round score (if it could have been carried over) would have placed him fifth. Nelson Évora of Portugal, who had finished 40th in 2004, had become the best triple jumper in the world over the intervening four years, winning the 2007 world championship and coming into the Beijing Games as the favorite.

Macedonia, Morocco, and Slovakia each made their first appearance in the event. The United States competed for the 25th time, having missed only the boycotted 1980 Games.

Qualification

The qualifying standards were 17.10 m (26.9 ft) (A standard) and 16.80 m (26.41 ft) (B standard). Each National Olympic Committee (NOC) was able to enter up to three entrants providing they had met the A qualifying standard in the qualifying period (1 January 2007 to 23 July 2008). NOCs were also permitted to enter one athlete providing he had met the B standard in the same qualifying period. The maximum number of athletes per nation had been set at 3 since the 1930 Olympic Congress.

Competition format

The competition used the two-round format introduced in 1936. In the qualifying round, each jumper received three attempts to reach the qualifying distance of 17.10 metres; if fewer than 12 men did so, the top 12 (including all those tied) would advance. In the final round, each athlete had three jumps; the top eight received an additional three jumps, with the best of the six to count.

Records

Prior to this competition, the existing world and Olympic records were as follows.

No new world or Olympic records were set during the competition. The following national records were set during the competition:

Schedule

All times are China Standard Time (UTC+8)

Results

Qualifying

Qualifying Performance 17.10 (Q) or at least 12 best performers (q) advance to the Final.

Final

References

Athletics at the 2008 Summer Olympics
Triple jump at the Olympics
Men's events at the 2008 Summer Olympics